William Miller (9 March 1905 – 24 June 1974) was an Australian cricketer. He played one first-class match for Western Australia in 1924/25.

References

External links
 

1905 births
1974 deaths
Australian cricketers
Western Australia cricketers
Cricketers from Perth, Western Australia